Black Mountain is a town in Buncombe County, North Carolina, United States. The population was 7,848 at the 2010 census. It is part of the Asheville Metropolitan Statistical Area. The town is named for the old train stop at the Black Mountain Depot and is located at the southern end of the Black Mountain range of the Blue Ridge Mountains in the Southern Appalachians.

History
Black Mountain in its present form was incorporated on March 4, 1893. The first recorded inhabitants of the area were the Cherokee. A road was built through the area in 1850 and a railroad followed in 1879.

The Black Mountain College Historic District, Black Mountain Downtown Historic District, Blue Ridge Assembly Historic District, Dougherty Heights Historic District, Rafael Guastavino Sr., Estate, Intheoaks, Monte Vista Hotel, South Montreat Road Historic District, and Thomas Chapel A.M.E. Zion Church are listed on the National Register of Historic Places.

About the town
The downtown area has many eclectic shops, attracting seasonal tourism, a main staple of the local economy. There are also many quaint bed and breakfasts. The town is near several Christian retreat areas including Ridgecrest and Montreat Conference Center.

Black Mountain College was formerly located near the town, but the Black Mountain College Museum + Arts Center, dedicated to the experimental educational institution's history, is now located in downtown Asheville. Black Mountain is also the site of the Swannanoa Valley Museum. The Black Mountain Center for the Arts is located down the street from the museum. In 2002 the community raised 1.2 million dollars to buy the old Town Hall and convert it into the Art Center.

Black Mountain News is a weekly newspaper covering Black Mountain and the Swannanoa Valley area.

Geography
Black Mountain is located in eastern Buncombe County at  (35.619208, -82.325434). The town of Montreat borders Black Mountain to the north, and the unincorporated community of Swannanoa is on the western border. U.S. Route 70 (State Street) is the main road through the center of town. Interstate 40 passes just to the south of downtown, with access from exits 64 and 65.

The Swannanoa River flows from east to west through the town, rising just  to the east at Swannanoa Gap on the crest of the Appalachians. The Swannanoa River flows west to the French Broad River, part of the Tennessee River basin that ultimately flows to the Gulf of Mexico via the Mississippi River, while Swannanoa Creek east of the gap is part of the Catawba River-Santee River system, reaching the Atlantic Ocean north of Charleston, South Carolina.

Demographics

2020 census

As of the 2020 United States census, there were 8,426 people, 3,913 households, and 2,255 families residing in the town.

2000 census
As of the census of 2000, there were 7,511 people, 3,340 households, and 2,027 families residing in the town. The population density was 1,165.7 people per square mile (450.3/km2). There were 3,703 housing units at an average density of 574.7 per square mile (222.0/km2). The racial makeup of the town was 90.84% White, 6.27% African American, 0.31% Native American, 0.87% Asian, 0.04% Pacific Islander, 0.45% from other races, and 1.22% from two or more races. Hispanic or Latino of any race were 0.81% of the population.

There were 3,340 households, out of which 22.6% had children under the age of 18 living with them, 47.2% were married couples living together, 10.3% had a female householder with no husband present, and 39.3% were non-families. 34.7% of all households were made up of individuals, and 16.3% had someone living alone who was 65 years of age or older. The average household size was 2.15 and the average family size was 2.75.

In the town, the population was spread out, with 19.1% under the age of 18, 7.1% from 18 to 24, 25.7% from 25 to 44, 26.1% from 45 to 64, and 22.1% who were 65 years of age or older. The median age was 44 years. For every 100 females, there were 83.1 males. For every 100 females age 18 and over, there were 78.3 males.

The median income for a household in the town was $35,541, and the median income for a family was $43,373. Males had a median income of $28,604 versus $22,476 for females. The per capita income for the town was $20,509. About 7.6% of families and 10.1% of the population were below the poverty line, including 14.2% of those under age 18 and 7.6% of those age 65 or over.

In popular culture
Black Mountain features in the 1994 Patricia Cornwell novel The Body Farm.

Black Mountain is featured in the 2009 novel One Second After and 2015 sequel One Year After by William R. Forstchen, a town resident. Many local institutions and residents appear in the novel, although the story itself is fictional.

Black Mountain also figures in The Longest Ride by Nicholas Sparks, a book that mentions the former college and visual arts community.

Black Mountain is the site of the Three Billboards featured in the 2017 film, Three Billboards Outside Ebbing, Missouri, with one billboard exposed in April 2016, with the other two covered up.

Government and infrastructure
The North Carolina Department of Public Safety (formerly the North Carolina Department of Corrections) operates the Swannanoa Correctional Center for Women. It opened on July 7, 2008, taking women previously at the Black Mountain Correctional Center for Women.

Education
 Black Mountain College (1933-1957)
 Montreat College (Black Mountain)

Events
 Lake Eden Arts Festival

Notable people

Literary
 Patricia Cornwell
 William R. Forstchen
 Nicholas Sparks

Music

 McDibbs, music venue
 Roberta Flack, singer
 Floating Action (band) (Seth Kauffman)
 The Jellyrox (Matthew Langston)
 The Morris Brothers, country music group
 David Wilcox, singer-songwriter
 Artimus Pyle, drummer Lynyrd Skynyrd

Architecture
 Rafael Guastavino

Athletes and sporting figures
 Brad Daugherty, NBA All-Star, ESPN commentator, and NASCAR team owner
 Brad Johnson, NFL quarterback who led the Buccaneers to their Super Bowl XXXVII title
 Sammy Stewart, Major League Baseball pitcher
 Roy Williams, NCAA basketball coach

Religion
 L. Nelson Bell, missionary, Christianity Today founder
 Andrew Brunson, American pastor imprisoned in Turkey

Film, television, and theater
 Matt Lutz, actor

Politicians
 Roy A. Taylor, congressman

Diplomats
 Philip S. Kosnett, Foreign Service Officer; U.S. Ambassador to the Republic of Kosovo 2018-2021

References

External links
 Town of Black Mountain official website
 Black Mountain - Swannanoa Chamber of Commerce

Towns in North Carolina
Towns in Buncombe County, North Carolina
Asheville metropolitan area